Todd Strasser (born May 5, 1950) is an American writer of more than 140 young-adult and middle grade novels and many short stories and works of non-fiction, some written under the pen names Morton Rhue and T.S. Rue.

Biography
Strasser was born in New York City. He studied literature and creative writing at New York University and Beloit College. He earned his living as a reporter for the Middletown Times Herald-Record newspaper, and as a copywriter for Compton Advertising in New York City.
His first novel was Angel Dust Blues (1978). He is the father of two children, and an avid tennis player and surfer. In Germany, under the pen name Morton Rhue, he is the best-selling author of such novels as Die Welle, Dschihad Online, Ich knall euch ab!, Boot Camp, No Place, No Home, Ghetto Kidz, Asphalt Tribe, and a number of other titles. In 2008, The Wave (the movie version of Die Welle) starring Jürgen Vogel, debuted at the Sundance Film Festival and went on to become a box office success in many European countries. In November 2019 Netflix released a world-wide series, We Are The Wave, inspired by Strasser's novel.

Strasser's newest novels are Price of Duty (In Germany, American Hero) and Summer of '69. Price of Duty is about how the military uses promises of heroics, teamwork, and excitement to entice young people to enlist despite the life and death risks. The book has received uniformly outstanding reviews and was named an Amazon Young Adult Book of the Month for July, 2018, as well as a 2018 New York Public Library Best Book for Teens.

Summer of '69 is Strasser's autobiographical novel/memoir about his life during the summer of Woodstock, the war in Vietnam, and the first man to set foot on the moon. It was written for adults and mature teens and explores the culture, drug use, sexual mores, and music of the 1960s, as well as his own problems with the military draft and the demise of his family caused by a nearly forgotten tragedy many years before. Reviewing for Booklist, Ilene Cooper wrote:"Drugs, sex, and rock 'n' roll, those hallmarks of the summer of 1969, are all here, but there's so much more... The story captures the mood and spirit of the times …The best part transcends eras: Lucas' introspection as he contemplates his place in the world.”

Themes
Strasser often writes about timely themes like nuclear war, Nazism, bullying at schools, homelessness, and school shootings. His novel The Wave, written under the pen name Morton Rhue, is a novelization of the teleplay by Johnny Dawkins for the 1981 television movie The Wave. Both the novel and the television movie are fictionalized accounts of the "Third Wave" teaching experiment by Ron Jones in a Cubberley High School history class in Palo Alto, California. The novel, now credited to Todd Strasser, has been translated into more than a dozen languages and is read in many schools around the world.

His 2014 novel, Fallout, is part memoir and part speculative fiction featuring nuclear war that results from the 1962 Cuban Missile Crisis. A review in The New York Times called it "Exciting,  harrowing ... Superb entertainment ... It thrums along with finely wrought atmosphere and gripping suspense.

Strasser's works have sometimes proved to be controversial. Recently, his novel American Terrorist was withdrawn from publication in the United States after an uproar about it caused by a brief description of the book which appeared on Goodreads. The novel has been published in Germany under the title Dschihad Online, and in France with the title Djihad Online.

Strasser is the author of the Time Zone High trilogy, How I Changed My Life, How I Created My Perfect Prom Date, and How I Spent My Last Night on Earth. How I Created My Perfect Prom Date was adapted for the feature film Drive Me Crazy, starring Adrian Grenier and Melissa Joan Hart.

Other novels for young adults include The Accident, which became the television movie Over the Limit, as well as Angel Dust Blues, Friends Till the End, and A Very Touchy Subject. The latter also became a television movie, entitled Can a Guy Say No? Another novel, Workin' For Peanuts, was adapted to a television movie with the same title.

A trilogy of mystery thrillers for older young adult readers includes Wish You Were Dead, Blood on My Hands, and Kill You Last.

Strasser has also written a number of young adult series, including Impact Zone (about surfing), Drift X (about drift car competitions), and Here Comes Heavenly (about a punk nanny with magical powers).

His books for middle-graders include CON-fidence, The Diving Bell, and Abe Lincoln for Class President. His series for middle graders include the 17-book Help! I'm Trapped... collection, as well as the Don't Get Caught, Against the Odds, and Camp Run-A-Muck books. He wrote Is That a Dead Dog in Your Locker?, Is That a Sick Cat in Your Backpack?, Is That a Glow-In-The-Dark Bunny in Your Pillow Case?, Is That an Angry Penguin in Your Gym Bag?, and Is That an Unlucky Leprechaun In Your Lunch?

His Kids' Books series of E-books includes The Kids' Book of Gross Facts and Feats (two volumes), The Kids' Book of Weird Science, The Kids' Book of Stupendously Stupid Stunts, The Kids' Book of Really Dumb American Criminals, The Kids' Book of Amazing Sports Facts and Feats, The Kids' Book of Funny Animal Jokes, and others.

Strasser has published articles and short stories in The New Yorker, Esquire, and The New York Times.

Awards and honors

Fallout (2013)
2014 American Library Association Best Fiction for Young Adults 
2014 American Library Association Quick Pick for Reluctant Young Adult Readers 
2014 National Council for the Social Studies Notable Tradebook for Young People 
2014 International Reading Association Young Adults' Choice 
2014 Bank Street Teacher's College Best Children's Books of the Year 

No Place (2014)
2015 National Council for the Social Studies Notable Tradebook for Young People 

If I Grow Up (2009) 
2010 National Council for the Social Studies Notable Tradebook for Young People 

Boot Camp (2007) 
2008 American Library Association Quick Pick for Reluctant Young Adult Readers 
2015  American Library Association Popular Paperback for Young Adults 

Can't Get There From Here (2004)
2005 American Library Association Best Fiction for Young Adults 
2005 American Library Association Quick Pick for Reluctant Young Adult Readers 
2006 International Reading Association Young Adults' Choice
2010  American Library Association Popular Paperback for Young Adults 

Give A Boy A Gun (2001)
2002 International Reading Association Young Adults' Choice 
2006 American Library Association Popular Paperback for Young Adults 

Wish You Were Dead (2009)
2011 American Library Association Quick Pick for Reluctant Young Adult Readers 
2011 Tayshas (Texas Library Association): Summer Reading List
2012 New York Public Library: Books for the Teen Age.
2012 Illinois: Abraham Lincoln H.S. Book Award
2012 Voice of Youth Advocates Summer Reading List

Bibliography

Help! I'm Trapped
Help! I'm Trapped in My Teacher's Body (1993)
Help! I'm Trapped in the First Day of School (1994)
Help! I'm Trapped in Obedience School (1995)
Help! I'm Trapped in My Gym Teacher's Body (1996)
Help! I'm Trapped in the President's Body (1997)
Help! I'm Trapped in My Sister's Body (1997)
Help, I'm Trapped in Obedience School Again (1997)
Help, I'm Trapped in Santa's Body (1997)
Help! I'm Trapped in My Principal's Body (1998)
Help! I'm Trapped in the First Day of Summer Camp (1998)
Help! I'm Trapped in My Camp Counselor's Body (1998)
Help! I'm Trapped in an Alien's Body (1998)
Help! I'm Trapped in a Movie Star's Body (1999)
Help! I'm Trapped in My Lunch Lady's Body (1999)
Help! I'm Trapped in a Professional Wrestler's Body (2000)
Help! I'm Trapped in a Vampire's Body (2000)
Help! I'm Trapped in a Supermodel's Body (2001)
Help! I'm Trapped in Summer Camp (2006)
Help! I'm Trapped in the First Day of Camp (2011)

Lifeguards
Summers Promise (1993)
Summer's End (1993)

Wordsworth
Wordsworth and the Cold Cut Catastrophe (1995)
Wordsworth and the Kibble Kidnapping (1995)
Wordsworth and the Roast Beef Romance (1995)
Wordsworth and the Mail-Order Meatloaf Mess (1995)
Wordsworth and the Tasty Treat Trick (1996)
Wordsworth and the Lip-Smacking Licorice Love Affair (1996)

How I...
How I Changed My Life (1995)
How I Created My Perfect Prom Date (1998)
How I Spent My Last Night on Earth (1998)

Rock 'n' Roll Summer
The Boys in the Band (1996)
Playing for Love (1996)

Camp Run-A-Muck
Greasy Grimy Gopher Guts (1997)
Mutilated Monkey Meat (1997)
Chopped-Up Birdy's Feet (1997)

Against the Odds
Grizzly Attack (1998)
Buzzard's Feast (1999)
Gator Prey (1999)
Shark Bite (1998)

Impact Zone
Take Off (2004)
Cut Back (2004)
Close Out (1999)

Here Comes Heavenly
Here Comes Heavenly (1999)
Dance Magic (1999)
Pastabilities (2000)
Spell Danger (2000)

Don't Get Caught
Driving the School Bus (2000)
Wearing the Lunch Lady's Hairnet (2001)
In the Girl's Locker Room (2001)
In the Teacher's Lounge (2001)

DriftX
Slide or Die (2006)
Battle Drift (2006)
Sidewayz Glory (2006)

Mob Princess
For Money and Love (2007)
Stolen Kisses, Secrets, and Lies (2007)
Count Your Blessings (2007)

Nighttime
Too Dark to See (2007)
Too Scared to Sleep (2007)
Too Afraid to Scream (2008)

Thrillogy
Wish You Were Dead (2009)
Blood on My Hands (2010)
Kill You Last (2011)

Crematory Mystery Romance
Young Hearts Aflame (2022)

Standalone books
{| class="wikitable sortable"
|-
! Title
! Publisher
! Publication date
! ISBN
! Notes
|-
| Angel Dust Blues || Coward, McCann & Geoghegan, Inc. || 1979 || / || Todd Strasser's first novel.
|-
| Friends Till the End || Delacorte Press || 1981 || / ||
|-
| The Wave || Dell || 1981 ||  || Novelization of the 1981 ABC television film The Wave; Todd Strasser's first novelization.
|-
| Rock 'N' Roll Nights || Delacorte Press || 1982 || / ||
|-
| Workin' for Peanuts || Delacorte Press || 1983 || / ||
|-
| Turn It Up! || Delacorte Press || 1984 || / || Sequel to Rock 'N' Roll Nights.
|-
| The Complete Computer Popularity Program || Delacorte Press || 1984 || / ||
|-
| A Very Touchy Subject || Delacorte Press || 1985 || / ||
|-
| Ferris Bueller's Day Off || Signet Books || June 1986 || / || Novelization of the 1986 Paramount Pictures film Ferris Bueller's Day Off.
|-
| Wildlife || Delacorte Press || 1987 || / || Sequel to Rock 'N' Roll Nights and Turn It Up!.
|-
| The Mall from Outer Space || Scholastic || October 1987 || / ||
|-
| The Family Man || St. Martin's Press || February 1988 || / || Strasser's first adult fiction.
|-
| The Accident || Delacorte Press || 1988 || / || Adapted for television as an installment of the series ABC Afterschool Special (Season 18, Episode 5 "Over the Limit") (1990).
|-
| Cookie || Signet Books || 1989 || / || Novelization of the 1989 Warner Bros. film Cookie.
|-
| Pink Cadillac || Signet Books || May 1989 || / || Novelization of the 1989 film Pink Cadillac. 
|-
| Beyond the Reef || Delacorte Press || September 1989 || / || Illustrations by Debbe Heller.
|-
| Moving Target || Fawcett Juniper Books || September 1989 || / || Co-written with Dennis Freeland.
|-
| Home Alone || Scholastic || January 1991 || / || Novelization of the 1990 20th Century Fox film Home Alone.
|-
| The Diving Bell || Scholastic || May 1992 || / ||
|-
| Honey, I Blew Up the Kid || Scholastic || 1992 || / || Novelization of the 1992 Walt Disney Pictures film Honey, I Blew Up the Kid.
|-
| Home Alone 2: Lost in New York || Scholastic || November 1992 || / || Novelization of the 1992 20th Century Fox film Home Alone 2: Lost in New York.
|-
| The Good Son || Pocket Books || 1993 || / || Novelization of the 1993 20th Century Fox film The Good Son.
|-
| Hocus Pocus || Disney Press || 1993 || / || Novelization of the 1993 Walt Disney Pictures film Hocus Pocus.
|-
| Super Mario Bros. || Hyperion Books || 1993 || / || Novelization of the 1993 Hollywood Pictures film Super Mario Bros..
|-
| Free Willy || Scholastic || July 1993 || /  || Novelization of the 1993 Warner Bros. film Free Willy.
|-
| Rookie of the Year || The Trumpet Club || September 1993 || / || Novelization of the 1993 20th Century Fox film Rookie of the Year.
|-
| The Three Musketeers || Disney Press || 1993 || / || Novelization of the 1993 Walt Disney Pictures film The Three Musketeers.
|-
| Freaked || The Trumpet Club || October 1993 || /  || Novelization of the 1993 20th Century Fox film Freaked.
|-
| Addams Family Values || Pocket Books || December 1993 || / || Novelization of the 1993 Paramount Pictures film Addams Family Values.
|-
| The Beverly Hillbillies || HarperPaperbacks || 1993 || / || Novelization of the 1993 20th Century Fox film The Beverly Hillbillies.
|-
| Walt Disney's Lady and the Tramp || Disney Press || 1994 || / || Novelization of the 1955 Walt Disney Animation Studios film Lady and the Tramp.
|-
| 3 Ninjas Kick Back || Scholastic || March 1994 || / || Novelization of the 1994 film 3 Ninjas Kick Back.
|-
| Walt Disney's Peter Pan || Disney Press || 1994 || / || Novelization of the 1953 Walt Disney Animation Studios film Peter Pan.
|-
| The Pagemaster || Scholastic || November 1994 || / || Novelization of the 1994 film The Pagemaster.
|-
| Miracle on 34th Street || Scholastic || November 1994 || / || Novelization of the 1994 20th Century Fox film Miracle on 34th Street.
|-
| Richie Rich || Scholastic || December 1994 || / || Novelization of the 1994 Warner Bros. film Richie Rich.
|-
| Street Fighter || Newmarket Press || December 1994 || / || Novelization of the 1994 Universal Pictures film Street Fighter.
|-
| Please Don't Be Mine, Julie Valentine! || Scholastic || January 1995 || / ||
|-
| Man of the House || Disney Press || March 1995 || / || Novelization of the 1995 Walt Disney Pictures film Man of the House.
|-
| Tall Tale: The Unbelievable Adventures of Pecos Bill || Disney Press || April 1995 || / || Novelization of the 1995 Walt Disney Pictures film Tall Tale.
|-
| Free Willy 2: The Adventure Home || Scholastic || July 1995 || / || Novelization of the 1995 Warner Bros. film Free Willy 2: The Adventure Home.
|-
| The Amazing Panda Adventure || Scholastic || August 1995 || / || Novelization of the 1995 Warner Bros. film The Amazing Panda Adventure.
|-
| Jumanji || Scholastic || December 1995 || / || Novelization of the 1995 TriStar Pictures film Jumanji.
|-
| How I Created My Perfect Prom Date. || Simon & Schuster || September 1996 || / || Originally published as Girl Gives Birth to Own Prom Date; later adapted into the film Drive Me Crazy (1999).
|-
| Howl-A-Ween || || 1996 || ||
|-
| Hey Dad, Get a Life! || Holiday House || October 1996 || / ||
|-
| A Horse Called Farmer || || 1997 || ||
|-
| Abe Lincoln for Class President!  || || 1997 || ||
|-
| Home Alone 3 || Scholastic || December 1997 || / || Novelization of the 1997 20th Century Fox film Home Alone 3.
|-
| Kidnap Kids || || 1998 || ||
|-
| Byte Barkley: Secret Agent K-9 || || 1999 || ||
|-
| Drive Me Crazy || || 1999 || ||
|-
| Give a Boy a Gun || Simon & Schuster || 2000 ||  ||
|-
| Con-Fidence || || 2002 || ||
|-
| Thief of Dreams || Putnam Juvenile || 2003 ||  ||
|-
| Can't Get There from Here || Simon & Schuster Children's Publishing || 2004 ||  ||
|-
| Slide or Die || Simon Pulse || 2006 ||  ||
|-
| Cheap Shot || || 2007 || ||
|-
| Boot Camp || || 2007 || ||
|-
| Is That A Glow-in-the-Dark Bunny In Your Pillowcase? || || 2007 || ||
|-
| Is That a Sick Cat in Your Backpack? || || 2007 || ||
|-
| Is That A Dead Dog In Your Locker? || || 2008 || ||
|-
| If I Grow Up || || 2009 || ||
|-
| Is That an Angry Penguin in Your Gym Bag? || || 2009 || ||
|-
| Is That an Unlucky Leprechaun in Your Lunch? || || 2009 || ||
|-
| Famous || || 2011 || ||
|-
| Trailer Girl || || 2013 || ||
|-
| Fallout || || 2013 || ||
|-
| No Place || || 2014 || ||
|-
| The Beast of Cretacea || || 2015 || ||
|-
| The Case of the Murderous Young Millionairess || || 2016 || ||
|-
| American Terrorist || || 2016 || / || Fictional story about two brothers divided against each other during an FBI sting operation. Removed from print.
|-
| Price of Duty || || 2018 || ||
|-
| Summer of '69 || || 2019 || ||
|-
| The Good War || || 2021 || ||
|}

Other works
"Young Adult Books: Stalking the Teen." Horn Book Magazine,'' vol. 62, no. 2 (1986, Mar.-Apr.), pp. 236–239.

References

External links

 
 
 
 

Living people
1950 births
American children's writers 
American male journalists
Journalists from New York City
Writers from New York City
American male novelists
20th-century American novelists
21st-century American novelists
20th-century American male writers
21st-century American male writers
Novelists from New York (state)
20th-century American non-fiction writers
21st-century American non-fiction writers
Larchmont, New York
Beloit College alumni
20th-century pseudonymous writers
21st-century pseudonymous writers